is a run and gun video game developed and published in 1990 by Masaya for Sega Genesis. It was released in America as Target Earth. It was re-released on the Wii’s Virtual Console, and on the Nintendo Switch Online + Expansion Pack. It is the first game in the Assault Suits series.

Plot 
In 2201 expanding technologies have given man the power to live anywhere in space. With this backdrop, the story begins with a war between Earth (and its colonies) fighting a cyborg army returning from deep space. In the early stages, the nature or purpose of these cybernetic adversaries, named Chron, is unknown. However, it is later revealed that Chron are the survivors of a failed space expedition (Outer Space Expeditionary Party) sent by Earth one hundred years earlier.

The Earth Defense League fights to defend Earth. Its core is the Assault Suit—a twelve-foot-tall armored battle machine with powerful fighting capabilities. The player is Rex, an Assault Suit Wing commander and master at Assault Suit combat. The battle begins on Ganymede and shifts to battles in space, on the Earth, and inside enemy outposts.

Gameplay
Target Earth offers 8 stages. Much of the game's mechanics fall in line with those of horizontal shooters with some subdued platforming elements. The player's performance after completing a stage dictates the weapons, armor, and accessories that are unlocked in the next stage. The game features 14 weapons, a lot of firepower in the early 1990s. The assortment of armaments increased replay value by encouraging the player to experiment with ways to defeat enemies.

While the official information for the game indicates that it is only single-player, it is possible for a second player to have limited control over enemy movement and attacks on screen.

Release
Certain scenes in Target Earth were censored. For example, a scene in which a comrade does not make it back to the ship in time and burns up in the planet's atmosphere was removed. The romantic relationship between Rex and Leana was downplayed. These scenes were restored in the remake. The Western localization of the second game in the Assault Suits series, Cybernator, was subject to censorship. The game is included on the Japanese Mega Drive Mini. The US version is accessible if the system is set to English.

Assault Suit Leynos 2 was released exclusively for the Sega Saturn in 1997, in Japan only. The gameplay is far more challenging as the shield cannot guard infinitely.

A remake by Dracue Co., Ltd. was released for the PlayStation 4 in Japan in December 2015, and in North America/EU in July 2016. A Microsoft Windows port of the remake was released in August 2016.

On June 30, 2022, the game was re-released on the Nintendo Switch Online + Expansion Pack.

See also
 Armored Core
 Front Mission
 Heavy Gear

Notes

References

External links
NCS
Target Earth Translation

1990 video games
Masaya Games games
Run and gun games
PlayStation 4 games
Sega Genesis games
Censored video games
Video games developed in Japan
Virtual Console games
Windows games
Video games set in the 23rd century
Cooperative video games
Assault Suit
Nintendo Switch Online games
Single-player video games